Shinall Mountain is a peak in Pulaski County, Arkansas, located in the foothills of the Ouachita Mountains on the western edge of Little Rock, the capital and most populous city of Arkansas. Shinall Mountain is made of Carboniferous rocks, and plant fossils can sometimes be found in the blue-hued black shales comprising the sides of its bluff.

Etymology
"Shinall" is a corruption of the French name "Chenault", the surname of a family (consisting of brothers Elijah Nelson Chenault and Benjamin Franklin Chenault, and their respective families) that settled near the base of Shinall Mountain before the American Civil War. Another derivation of the surname, "Chenal", is used for two related locations in western Pulaski County: Chenal Valley, a  upscale planned community in west Little Rock—which is adjacent to Shinall Mountain, and Chenal Parkway, a mostly divided four-lane thoroughfare (that actually scales Shinall Mountain) connecting Highways 10 and 300 to Little Rock's Financial Centre District. The Deltic Timber Corporation, who develops and manages Chenal Valley, chose the name as a foreign branding strategy. Because of the spelling and identical pronunciation, "Shinall" is often misspelled "Chenal" when referring to the peak.

Geography
Because Pinnacle Mountain is steeper, it appears higher than Shinall Mountain, despite it actually being 55 feet lower (at an elevation of ). According to the Geographic Names Information System (GNIS), Shinall Mountain is a summit.

Broadcast stations transmitting from Shinall Mountain
The peak of Shinall Mountain serves an antenna farm for broadcasters in the Little Rock–Pine Bluff Designated Market Area (DMA), and is dotted by a number of communications towers housing the transmitter facilities of most of the area's television and FM radio stations as well as cellular telephone carriers, emergency response, weather radio and amateur radio services, which are easily identifiable due to the navigational lights adorning the towers that can be seen for miles. The height of the mountain made it very attractive for broadcasters to maintain transmitter facilities, as the hilly terrain of Central Arkansas makes it difficult for communications signals to transmit at lower elevations without impairment.

The first television antenna on Shinall Mountain was erected in 1955 to house the transmitters of KARK-TV (channel 4) and KTHV (channel 11). The first FM station to transmit from Shinall Mountain was KARK-FM (103.7 FM, now KABZ), which began broadcasting there in 1967.

Television
The following television stations transmit from Shinall Mountain:

Due to that station originally being licensed to Pine Bluff (until 1958) and since-repealed FCC regulations requiring a transmitter to be located within  from a station's city of license, KATV maintained transmitters based in Jefferson County from its 1954 sign-on until 2008, transmitting for most of that timeframe from a  tower west-southwest of Redfield (near the present day KASN/KETS tower); the analog transmitter of KETS was also housed on that tower. After the Redfield tower collapsed during guy wire repair work on January 22, 2008, KATV set up a temporary analog transmitter at Shinall Mountain on a backup analog transmitter belonging to KTHV; it later received permission from the Federal Communications Commission (FCC) to permanently relocate its analog and digital transmitters to that tower.

Radio
The following radio stations transmit from Shinall Mountain:

In addition to commercial and non-commercial radio stations, the peak also houses the main office and three repeater transmitters (transmitting at 146.940, 147.300 and 444.200 MHz) belonging to Central Arkansas Radio Emergency Net (CAREN), an emergency communications amateur radio service that collaborates with the emergency management agencies of Little Rock, North Little Rock and Pulaski County and other emergency relief entities in Central Arkansas.

See also
 Ouachita Mountains
 U.S. Interior Highlands

References

Landforms of Pulaski County, Arkansas
Mountains of Arkansas